Now We May Begin is an album by the American R&B singer Randy Crawford, released in 1980 on Warner Bros. Records. The album got to No. 10 on the UK Albums Chart and No. 30 on the US Billboard Top R&B Albums chart. Now We May Begin has also been certified Silver in the UK by the BPI.

Overview
The album cut "One Day I'll Fly Away" was also certified silver in the UK by the BPI.

Track listing
All tracks composed by Joe Sample and Will Jennings; except where noted.
"Last Night at Danceland" - 4:53
"Tender Falls the Rain" (Randy Crawford) - 4:13
"My Heart is Not as Young as it Used to Be" - 3:51
"Now We May Begin" (Joe Sample) - 4:52
"Blue Flame" - 6:25
"One Day I'll Fly Away" - 5:00
"Same Old Story (Same Old Song)" - 4:05
"When Your Life Was Low" - 3:20

Personnel
 Mike Baird - drums
 Roland Bautista - guitar
 Oscar Brashear - trumpet
 Eddie "Bongo" Brown - percussion
 Randy Crawford - vocals
 Paulinho da Costa - percussion
 Wilton Felder - bass guitar, producer, tenor saxophone
 Melvin Franklin - background vocals
 Bernie Grundman - mastering
 Stix Hooper - drums, producer
 Tom Hooper - executive assistant
 Abraham Laboriel - bass guitar
 Pamela Hope Lobue - production coordination
 Robert Margouleff   - mixing
 Timothy May - guitar
 Gwen Owens - background vocals
 Dean Parks - guitar
 Rick Ruggieri - mixing
 Joe Sample - keyboards, producer, string arrangements                   
 Norman Seeff - photography
 Richard Seireenim - art direction
 Howard Siegel - mixing
 Jeremy Smith - engineer
 Hill Swimmer -	assistant engineer
 Julia Tillman - background vocals
 David T. Walker - guitar
 Maxine Willard Waters: background vocals

Sales and certifications

References

1980 albums
Warner Records albums
Randy Crawford albums